Yining, also known as Ghulja or Qulja and formerly Ningyuan, is a county-level city in Northwestern Xinjiang, People's Republic of China and the seat of the Ili Kazakh Autonomous Prefecture. Historically, Yining is the successor to the ruined city of Almaliq in neighbouring Huocheng County. Yining is the third largest city in Xinjiang after Ürümqi and Korla.

Area and population 
The city of Yining is a county-level administrative unit located along Ili River. It is the most populous city in the Ili Kazakh Autonomous Prefecture.

Yining's population is primarily Uyghur, Han, Hui, and Kazakh, along with smaller numbers of people of Mongolian, Xibe, Uzbek, Russian, or other ethnicity.

History

Note on historical place names 
From 13-15th century it was under the control of Chagatai Khanate. Another Mongol empire—the Zunghar Khanate—established around Ili area. In the 19th and early 20th century, the word Kuldja or Ghulja was often used in Russia and in the West as the name for the entire Chinese part of the Ili River basin as well as for its two main cities. The usage of 1911 Encyclopædia Britannica is fairly characteristic: it defines Kulja as a "territory in north-west China" bounded by the Russian border and the mountains that surround the Ili basin and it talks about two major cities of the region:
 Kulja (i.e. today's Yining) or more specifically Old Kulja (elsewhere, also called Taranchi Kulja), which was the commercial center of the region.
 Suidun (i.e. Suiding, now called Shuiding) or more specifically New Kulja, Manchu Kulja or Ili (elsewhere, also Chinese Kulja), the Chinese fortress and the regional capital.
Until the 1860s, Huiyuan to the south of Suiding was the regional capital.

Qing dynasty 
The fort of Ningyuan was built in 1762 to accommodate new settlers from southern Xinjiang. The forts of Huining and Xichun built later in 1765 and 1780 were also located within the modern Yining City.

The Sino-Russian Treaty of Kulja 1851 opened the area for trade.

In 1864–66, the city suffered severely from fighting during the Dungan Revolt. The city and the rest of the Ili River basin were seized by the Russians in 1871 during Yakub Beg's independent rule of Kashgaria. It was restored to the Chinese under the terms of the Treaty of Saint Petersburg (1881). In 1888, the Ningyuan County was established.

The Geographical Magazine in 1875 by Sir Clements Robert Markham stated:

What little industry Kulja possesses is all due to the Chinese, who transplanted the taste for art, assiduity and skilfulness of their pigtailed race, even to these western outskirts of "the celestial flowery dominion of the Middle." Had the Taranjis and Kalmuks been left to themselves, or had they remained in a preponderating majority, Kulja would not be a bit farther advanced than either Yarkand or Aksu. The principal trades are the following:— founders, manufacturing kettles, plates, and other implements of a very primitive form; paper-makers, whose productions do not seem to be superior to the paper manufactured at the present time after Chinese patterns at Khokand and Samarkand. There are, moreover, some confectionaries in which cakes of all shapes are baked of rice and millet, overlaid with sugar; also maccaroni-makers, the Taranjis being notoriously very fond of dried farinaceous food. In Eastern Turkistan there still exist many similar trades, and although their products are not equal to European articles of the same kind—I mean here the fabrics of the formerly western Chinese provinces— they are still said to be profitable. Finally among the tradesmen we may mention millers, vinegar manufacturers and potters. The number of factories amount to-day at Kulja to 38, wherein over 131 hands are occupied. To this of course other tradespeople have to be added, such as 169 boot-makers, 50 blacksmiths, 48 carpenters, 11 brass-founders, 3 silversmiths, 26 stone-cutters, and 2 tailors.

Republic of China 
In 1914, the Ningyuan County was renamed Yining County to avoid confusion with other places in China named Ningyuan.

People's Republic 
Yining became a separate city from Yining County in 1952. In 1962, major Sino-Soviet clashes took place along the Ili River.

In 1997, in what came to be known as the Gulja Incident or massacre, the city was rocked by two days of demonstrations or riots followed by a Communist government crackdown resulting in at least 9 deaths following the execution of 30 Uighur activists.

Geography 

The Ili River valley is far wetter than most of Xinjiang and has rich grazing land.

The City of Yining borders on Huocheng County in the west and the Yining County in the east; across the river in the south is Qapqal Xibe Autonomous County.

Climate 
Yining (Gulja) has a semi-arid climate (Köppen BSk), without the strong variation in seasonal precipitation seen across most of China. Dry and sunny weather dominates year-round. Yet the influence of the Dzungarian Altau to the northwest and Boroboro Mountains to the northeast helps keep the city warmer than more easterly locales on a similar latitude. Diurnal temperature ranges tend to be large from April to October. With monthly percent possible sunshine ranging from 53% in December to 73% in August and September, sunshine is abundant and the city receives 2,834 hours of bright sunshine annually.

Administrative divisions
The administrative divisions of Yining include eight subdistricts, two towns, and seven townships (the below names are pinyin transcriptions may not necessarily be the official names):

Economy 
The city's nominal GDP was approximately 20.9 billion RMB (US$3.1 billion) as of 2015 with an annual increase of 7.6%.The nominal GDP per capita was approximately 38,805 RMB (US$5976). Yining is the chief city and the agricultural and commercial center of the Ili valley. It is an old commercial center trading in tea and cattle and it is still an agricultural area with extensive livestock raising. It has fruit orchards. Iron, coal and uranium are mined nearby.

Transportation
 Regular bus service is available to other cities in the region and taxis are available locally.
 Yining Airport is located several kilometers north of the city.
 The Jinghe-Yining-Horgos Railway, an electrified railway from Ürümqi to Yining to Khorgos on the China-Kazakhstan border was finished in the late 2009. Daily passenger service - an overnight  Ürümqi-Yining train service began on July 1, 2010.
 China National Highway 218
 China National Highway 312

Culture 
Ili Kazak Autonomous Prefecture Museum, opened in Yining in 2004, is one of Xinjiang's most important museums. In fact, at the time it opened it became, in the words of a Western scholar, the "only modern museum" in Xinjiang. (Xinjiang of course also has the provincial museum in Ürümqi; but at that time point, its old building had been demolished, while its replacement was still under construction). The museum houses archaeological and ethnological artefacts from throughout the prefecture.

Notable persons
 Muyesser Abdul'ehed
Dawut Abdurehim
 Edham Mamet
Masud Sabri
 Sanubar Tursun
 Shohrat Zakir

Notes

References

External links
 
 Yining City Government  
 Map of the City of Yining (Borders shown as they were before the annexation of the villages of Dadamutu ( on the map) and Panjin ( on the map) in 2004) 

Populated places in Xinjiang
Populated places along the Silk Road
Ili Kazakh Autonomous Prefecture
County-level divisions of Xinjiang